Charge of the Lancers is a 1954 American adventure film directed by William Castle and starring Paulette Goddard, Jean-Pierre Aumont and Karin Booth.

Plot
As the Crimean War rages, British Capt. Eric Evoir (Jean-Pierre Aumont) and Maj. Bruce Lindsey (Richard Wyler) are sent to the Crimea to protect a top-secret cannon capable of blasting through the walls of a nearby Russian fort. Lindsey, unfortunately, is captured by the Russians, who subject him to brutal interrogations. It's up to Evoir to save him. Along the way, Evoir meets a beautiful gypsy girl (Paulette Goddard) and begins an affair as intense as the war itself.

Cast
 Paulette Goddard as Tanya 
 Jean-Pierre Aumont as Capt. Eric Evoir 
 Richard Wyler as Maj. Bruce Lindsey 
 Karin Booth as Maria Sand 
 Charles Irwin as Tom Daugherty 
 Ben Astar as Gen. Inderman 
 Lester Matthews as Gen. Stanhope 
 Gregory Gaye as Col. Bonikoff 
 Ivan Triesault as Dr. Manus 
 Louis Merrill as Col. Zeansky 
 Tony Roux as Asa 
 Fernanda Eliscu as Keta

See also
 List of American films of 1954

References

External links

1954 films
American war films
American historical films
1950s historical films
1954 war films
Crimean War films
Columbia Pictures films
Films directed by William Castle
Films set in the 1850s
Fictional representations of Romani people
1950s English-language films
1950s American films